Justin Bere is a British architect based in London. He is founder of his own practice bere:architects and has developed a specialism in low energy passive house (Passivhaus) buildings, resulting in the first certified passive house building in London in 2010. In 2012 he was named one of the most influential people in UK sustainability by Building Design magazine.

Education and early career 
Following a childhood spent in East Africa, England and Northern Ireland, Bere studied architecture at the  Canterbury College of Art (now University for the Creative Arts). Upon graduation, he worked for a range of architectural firms, including Sir Michael Hopkins & Partners (now Hopkins Architects), before establishing his own firm in 1994.

Practice and research 
Bere established his practice, bere:architects, in 1994. Since its inception bere:architects has focused on low-energy buildings, and was amongst the first UK adopters of the Passive House (Passivhaus) design standard. Bere:architects has developed a distinctive practice model combining design-led architectural practice with environmental and building performance research. This has included working with University College London (‘UCL’) and Innovate UK (formerly the Technology Strategy Board, ‘TSB’) to produce and publish a number of detailed building performance and post-occupancy evaluation reports.

Bere is considered an authority on low-energy design and was named as one of the top 50 most influential people in UK sustainability, by Building Design magazine in 2012. He sat on the RIBA’s Sustainable Futures advisory group from 2010 to 2016. Bere also regularly speaks and advocates on sustainability in the built environment. He has been a guest speaker at the Passivhaus Institute’s International Passivhaus Conference in 2011 on the topic of ‘Cost effective solutions to social housing’  and in 2012 on the topic of ‘Operational performance of a Community Centre in London refurbished to the Passivhaus standard.’ He has been on the judging panel for the CIBSE awards in 2016 and 2017. He is the author of An Introduction to Passive House.

Notable projects

Publications
 An Introduction to Passive House, 2013
 The monitored performance of the first new London dwelling certified to the Passive House standard, Ian Ridley, Justin Bere, Alan Clarke, Yair Schwartz, Andrew Farr, 2013
 The Side by Side in use Monitored Performance of two Passive and Low Carbon Welsh Houses, Ian Ridley, Justin Bere, Hector Altamerino Medina, Sarah Lewis, Mila Durdev, 2014

References

External links
Official website

Living people
Modernist architects from England
21st-century British architects
Architects from London
Year of birth missing (living people)
Place of birth missing (living people)
Alumni of the University for the Creative Arts